Katan Aleinu (קטן עלינו) is a charity single written and composed by Israeli singer Static (one half of pop duo Static & Ben El Tavori) and his producer Yarden 'Jordi' Peleg. The song features 40 Israeli singers and was written and recorded in response to the 2019-2021 COVID-19 pandemic. Every share of the video was "matched" with donations to Israeli hospitals and medical staff. The song was released on November 24, 2020.

Background and writing 
Static and Jordi worked on the song for months and recording took place over three days. The song's title literally translates as "this is small for us," a popular Israeli adage more accurately meaning "we got this." The theme of the song is that Israel has gotten through other challenges and will likewise get through the pandemic. As of July 2022, the official music video had more than 22 million views on YouTube.

Participating artists 
Forty Israeli artists appeared on the track, including many who had competed on and/or won Eurovision Song Contests and reality singing shows The X Factor Israel and Kokhav Nolad. All artists volunteered their time for the project.

 Noa Kirel
 Gidi Gov
 Omer Adam
 Eden Ben Zaken
 Jasmin Moallem
 Eden Alene
 Roni Dalumi
 Lior Narkis
 Static & Ben El Tavori
 Anna Zak
 Mooki
 Eliad Nachum
 Nasreen Qadri
 Dudu Aharon
 Rami Kleinstein
 Gali Atari
 Eden Hason
 Ella-Lee Lahav
 Moshe Peretz
 Stephane Legar
 Subliminal

See also 
 Music of Israel

Links 

 Official Music Video

References

Israeli songs
Charity singles
2020 singles